Ǣrra Līða ("first ‘liða’") was the Anglo-Saxon name for the month of June.

Līða 

There are many theories as to what “liða” refers. Neopagans use the word to refer to Midsummer; however, the Anglo-Saxon scholar Bede mentions in his treatise De temporum ratione that “‘liða’ means ‘calm’, or ‘navigable’ in both the month and the serenity of the breezes, and the waters are usually navigable.” The fact that the Old English word for “to sail” is “līðan” would seem to support Bede's statement.

Bede also mentioned the sailing aspect of ‘liða’ in a second text, writing:

“[…] se mōnaþ is nemned on lǣden Iunius, and on ūre geþeōde se Ǣrra Līða, for ðon seō lyft biþ ðonne smylte and ða windas. Ond monnum biþ ðonne gewunelīc ðæt hī līðaþ ðonne on sǣs bryme.”

[…] the month is called Iunius in Latin and in our language, Ǣrra Liða, for the sky is quiet and so too the winds. And it is usual to sail upon the sea.

Æftera Līða 

The next month in the Anglo-Saxon calendar was Æftera Līða, (modern English: second ‘liða’), which corresponds to the modern July.

See also

Germanic calendar
Anglo-Saxon
Old English

References

June
Old English